Ageratum (whiteweed in the USA) is a genus of 40 to 60 tropical and warm temperate flowering annuals and perennials from the family Asteraceae, tribe Eupatorieae. Most species are native to Central America and Mexico but four are native to the United States.

They form tussocks or small hills. They grow to a height of 30 in. The opposite leaves are cordate or oval, hairy or tomentose. The margins are slightly toothed or serrate. The leaves form compact clusters.

The fluffy flowers are lavender-blue, pink, lilac, or white, and spread in small compound umbels. They give small, dry fruits.

Cultivation 
Ageratums are grown for their flowers, especially A. houstonianum.

Most common ageratums, "Hawaii" for example, are a short 6-8 inches when full grown. Tall ageratum are also available in seed catalogues. They are about 18 inches in height with blue flowers. There is also a medium height snowcapped variety, white top on blue flowers. The blues are most popular and common, but colors also include violet, pink and white. Their size and color makes ageratums good candidates for rock gardens, bedding, and containers. They grow well in sun or partial shade, from early summer to first frost. They are quite easy to grow, producing a profusion of fluffy flowers all season long.

Toxicity 
Several species of Ageratum are toxic, containing pyrrolizidine alkaloids. Ageratum houstonianum and Ageratum conyzoides cause liver lesions and are tumorigenic.

Weed risk 
Ageratum conyzoides and Ageratum houstonianum are prone to becoming rampant environmental weeds when grown outside of their natural range.

Species 
, Plants of the World online has 40 accepted species:
 

Selected synonyms include:
 Ageratum altissimum  — synonym of Ageratina altissima 
 Ageratum anisochroma  — synonym of  Ageratina anisochroma 
 Ageratum isocarphoides  — synonym of Ageratum echioides 
 Ageratum lavenia  — synonym of Adenostemma lavenia 
 Ageratum lucidum  — synonym of Ageratum corymbosum 
 Ageratum meridanum  — synonym of Ageratum microcarpum 
 Ageratum nelsonii  — synonym of Ageratum elassocarpum 
 Ageratum oliveri  — synonym of Ageratum oerstedii 
 Ageratum panamense  — synonym of Ageratum riparium 
 Ageratum pohlii  — synonym of Teixeiranthus pohlii  
 Ageratum radicans  — synonym of Ageratum peckii 
 Ageratum salicifolium  — synonym of Ageratum corymbosum 
 Ageratum stachyofolium  — synonym of Paneroa stachyofolia

Segregate genera 
The genus Paneroa consists of one species, Paneroa stachyofolia, native to Oaxaca, which was first described in Ageratum but which seems to be more closely related to Conoclinium and Fleischmannia.

References 

 
Asteraceae genera
Taxa named by Carl Linnaeus